Walter Arnold may refer to:

 Walter Arnold (GC) (1906–1988), Royal Air Force airman and recipient of the George Cross
 Walter Arnold (German sculptor) (1909–1979)
 Walter Arnold (footballer) (1876–1955), English footballer
 Walter S. Arnold, American sculptor and stone carver
 Walt Arnold (Walter Henslee Arnold; born 1958), American football player

See also
 Walter Yarnold (1893–1978), English cricketer